"I Got Mine" is a song by the British heavy metal band Motörhead. Released in 1983 in 7" and 12" vinyl pressings, the 12" has the bonus track "Tales of Glory". It is back with the B-side, "Turn You Round Again", which appears on CD re-issues of the Another Perfect Day album. The single reached number 46 in the UK Singles Chart.

This single features guitarist Brian "Robbo" Robertson, who replaced "Fast" Eddie Clarke during their second U.S. tour.

Track listing
All songs written by Ian Kilmister, Phil Taylor and Brian Robertson except where noted

7"
 "I Got Mine" (Brian Robertson, Ian Kilmister, Phil Taylor)
 "Turn You Round Again"

12"
 "I Got Mine" (Robertson, Kilmister, Taylor)
 "Turn You Round Again"
 "Tales of Glory"

Personnel
  Ian "Lemmy" Kilmister – bass, lead vocals
 Brian "Robbo" Robertson – guitar
 Phil "Philthy Animal" Taylor – drums

References 

Motörhead songs
1983 singles
Songs written by Brian Robertson (guitarist)
Songs written by Lemmy
Songs written by Phil Taylor (musician)
1983 songs
Bronze Records singles